Aackia is a genus of springtails in the family Isotomidae. It is a monotypic genus made up of a single species, Aackia karakoramensis. Both genus and species were described in 1966.

References 

Springtail genera
Monotypic arthropod genera